Rossbeevera griseobrunnea is a species of the fungal family Boletaceae. This species was first described in April 2019 from southern China.

References 

Fungi of China
Boletaceae